The 2013 version of the Syrian Cup was the 43rd edition to be played. It was the premier knockout tournament for football teams in Syria. Al-Wahda was the cup holder.

The winner qualified for the 2014 AFC Cup.

16 teams play a knockout tie, all games were played over one leg in a neutral Stadium.

First round

|}

1,2,3. Al-Hurriya, Al-Ittihad and Omayya all withdrew.

Quarter-finals

|}

Semi-finals

|}

Final

|}

References

2013
2013 domestic association football cups
Cup